ITV4 is a British free-to-air television channel which was launched on 1 November 2005. It is owned by ITV Digital Channels, a division of ITV plc, and is part of the ITV network. The channel has a line-up that consists of sports, cult classic films such as James Bond, US dramas, and classic ITV action series of the 1960s, 1970s and 1980s.

History
It was expected that ITV4 would replace the existing Men & Motors channel (which was replaced by ITV HD) in the same way Granada Plus was rebranded into ITV3, until ITV plc stated that the two channels would run alongside each other, forcing the ITV News Channel on Freeview to timeshare with ITV4. ITV replaced the failing News Channel with CITV. Both channels were on Freeview until ITV plc took Men & Motors off Freeview (although it remained on other platforms for some time until April 2010) and replaced it with the live quiz channel ITV Play. Some programming from Men & Motors was transferred to ITV4. 

ITV4 was the first channel to use the new on-screen look that was rolled out across the rest of ITV plc's channels on 16 January 2006. Red Bee Media designed the new logos and presentation for the entire corporation that saw the end of the yellow and blue squared look designed for ITV, ITV2 and the cube look for ITV3. An ITV 2005 interim results presentation revealed that an old style logo was designed for the channel but was never used on air.

The channel initially broadcast early in the evenings, but had its hours extended to cover daytime programming in February 2008, following previous trials where CITV handed over to ITV4 early in the weekends, closing at 12.30pm instead of the usual 6pm handover.

ITV4 was launched on UPC Ireland in Ireland on 4 January 2010, marking the first time the channel has been officially available in the country. The channel had already been (and remains) available to Irish viewers on free-to-air satellite for some time, but it has not been listed in the Sky electronic programme guide since its removal on 25 January 2006. On 1 April 2011, ITV4 was removed from UPC Ireland along with ITV2 and ITV3 due to the expiry of a carriage agreement between UPC and ITV. UPC Ireland claim that ITV is not in a position to renegotiate the deal because ITV had struck a deal with another channel provider to provide it with exclusive rights to air certain content from the channels. Conversely, UPC Ireland also claims to have been in discussions right up to the last moment in order to continue broadcasting the channels. ITV2, ITV3 and ITV4 were restored to the UPC Ireland line-up on 20 December 2011. Virgin Media One and its sister channel Virgin Media Two already hold carriage agreement to air certain ITV content within the Republic of Ireland, alternatively UTV is available within the Republic. ITV2 is available along with ITV3 and ITV4 within Switzerland, all three channels are available on SwisscomTV and UPC Cablecom. ITV4 is registered to broadcast within the European Union/EEA through ALIA in Luxembourg.

On 7 October 2022, the ITV4 Twitter account was deleted in order to streamline the ITV channels for a rebrand in November.

Launch
ITV4's launch night was on Freeview channel 30. Although it was broadcast on the Astra 2D satellite used by Sky, so users could manually tune it in.  It was launched on Sky channel 120, after ITV2 and ITV3 in the listings, on 1 November. Prior to this date, some sporting content was simulcast on Men & Motors in an ITV4 on M&M strand. It officially launched with Real Betis v Chelsea in the UEFA Champions League (Liverpool v Anderlecht was on ITV1 at the same time), the UKTV premiere of Kojak, and the film Carlito's Way.

Subsidiary channels

ITV4 +1

In late October 2008, it was announced that a timeshifted (+1) version of ITV4 would be launched by the end of the year. ITV4 +1 was launched on Sky on 1 December 2008, on Freesat on 9 December 2008 and on Virgin Media on 25 March 2010. It was delisted from Sky on 11 January 2011, due to the launch of ITV1 +1 (now known as ITV +1) taking up space on the EPG; the channel is still available on Freesat and Virgin. The channel was restored on 1 June 2012.

ITV4 HD

A high-definition simulcast of ITV4, ITV4 HD, was launched on 15 November 2010 alongside the sister channel, ITV3 HD on Sky. The channel was initially available through Sky's pay subscription service in a non-exclusive deal, before being added to Virgin Media's service on 14 March 2013. ITV4 HD's high definition content includes films, and sports events which currently include British Touring Car Championship, Tour de France, horse racing, snooker, darts (including the UK Open and the Players Championship Finals) and French Open tennis as well as highlights of other sporting events and content from the ITV Sport archives.

On 1 November 2022, in the lead up to the launch of ITVX and as part of the 18th anniversary of ITV3 and 17th anniversary of ITV4, the encryption was dropped on ITV4 HD at around 11am that day and so became free to air. Later that day, Freesat data had been added to ITV4 HD, indicating that the channel will be made available on Freesat soon. On 8 November 2022 the HD version replaced the SD version on Freesat channel 117.

Branding

2013 rebranding 
In line with the corporate rebranding of ITV, ITV4 received a new look on 14 January 2013. The channel received a "slate-grey" logo and became the "home of sport and cult classics". Channel promotion includes pub factoids and idents featuring viewer nominated "dreams come true".

2022 rebranding 
ITV4 received its first revamp in nine years in November 2022 as part of a redesign of all of ITV's main channels, being carried out in tandem with the launch of the streaming service ITVX. The idents launched on 15 November 2022. The logo is now coloured green and uses idents that are cross-used across ITV1, ITV2, ITV3, and ITVBe with different views which reflect the channel's image and programming output.

Former logos

Programming

Current programming

 AEW Dynamite 
 AEW Rampage 
 Auto Mundial
 The Avengers 
 Ax Men
 Bear's Mission with...
 Beat The Chasers
 Benidorm 
 The Big Fish Off The Big Match Revisited Britain's Busiest Motorway British Touring Car Championship Cadfael The Car Chasers Car Crash Global: Caught on Camera The Car Years Cash Cowboys The Champions The Chase Celebrity Special 
 Dempsey and Makepeace Duck Dynasty Extreme Salvage Squad Goodwood Revival Gordon, Gino and Fred: Road Trip 
 Hornblower Ironside ITV Sport Stories Junk & Disorderly Jeremy Wade's Mighty Rivers Kojak Lovecars: On the Road Magnum, P.I. Minder The Motorbike Show Monster Carp Mr. Bean Only When I Laugh Pawn Stars 
 The Professionals The Protectors River Monsters 
 Robin of Sherwood The Saint Sherlock Holmes The Sweeney Tenable When English Football Ruled Europe Who Wants to Be a Millionaire? World of Sport ('Best of..' compilations)

Former programming

 Columbo Fierce Fifth Gear Hell on Wheels Grandma Jane's Garden Adventures Take the Tower (2018)
 Football Genius (2018)
 The New Avengers Nitro Circus Quincy, M.E. Speed Freaks (2019)
 Space Precinct Storage Wars Storage Wars: New York Storage Wars: Texas''

Sports coverage
Before ITV4's launch in 2005, ITV's digital sports coverage was on ITV2, but after its launch all sports coverage moved to ITV4. In its first week, it had coverage of the aforementioned Real Betis v Chelsea game in the UEFA Champions League, and also had coverage of Middlesbrough v Dnipro Dnipropetrovsk in the UEFA Cup on the Thursday, and Amir Khan's fight against Steve Gethin from the Braehead Arena in Glasgow on the Saturday.

Current coverage
Football
 FA Cup Live & Replays (2008–2014 & 2022–present) 
 England Women's Team Qualifiers & Friendlies (2021–present) 
 Arnold Clark Cup (2022–present) 
 FIFA World Cup (2006–present: Extra group games) 
 UEFA European Championship (2008–present: Extra group games) 
 EFL Championship, League One, League Two & EFL Cup Highlights (2022–present: highlights on itv4 and repeated on itv) 

Cycling
 Tour de France (from 2002 until at least 2019, shared with Eurosport)
 Tour de Yorkshire
 Vuelta a España (2011–present)
 Critérium du Dauphiné
 Critérium International
 Liège–Bastogne–Liège
 Paris–Roubaix
 Tour Series cycling
 Tour of Britain
 Revolution Series

Rugby union
 Women's Rugby World Cup
 Under 20s Rugby World Cup
 Rugby World Cup
 Aviva Premiership Highlights (2008–2017 & 2022–present: highlights on itv4 and repeated on itv) 
 Aviva Premiership Live Coverage including Premiership Final (2022–present) 

Horse racing
 Weekly Saturday Afternoon Horse Racing, 40 days of big meetings such as Grand National on ITV with 60 days of horse racing on ITV4 (2017–present)

Motorsport
 Isle of Man TT (from 2009–present) 
 British Touring Car Championship (from 2005–present, live until 2026 with highlights on ITV)
 British Superbikes (live from 2005 to 2007 and highlights from 2009–present, live on British Eurosport)
 Superbike World Championship (highlights from 2016–present, live on British Eurosport)
 MotoGP (Live in 2021 from the French Round and highlights from 2014 to 2016, 2021–present)
 World Rally Championship (highlights from 2006–2008, 2013–2015, 2020-present)
 Motorsport UK (highlights from 2005–present)
 Goodwood Festival of Speed (highlights on ITV, shared with Sky Sports F1) 
 BRDC Formula 3 Highlights

Darts
 European Championship (2008, 2011, 2013–present)
 Players Championship Finals (2009–2010, 2011–present)
 The Masters (2013–present: PDC tournament, not to be confused with the BDO Winmau World Masters with ITV covered from 1974 to 1988)
 UK Open (2014–present, previously on Sky Sports)
 World Series of Darts Finals (2015–present)
 World Series of Darts (6 tournaments with live or delayed coverage on ITV4 from 2015–present)

Snooker
 Champion of Champions (2013–present)
 World Grand Prix (2015–present)
 Players Championship Grand Finals (2016–present)

Boxing
The Big Fight Live (2005–2010 & 2017–present, selected fights on ITV4 with others on ITV Box Office)
Premier Boxing Champions (2019–present, selected fights on ITV4 and more fights on ITV Box Office)

Wrestling
 AEW Dynamite  (2019–present, full broadcast on ITV4 on Friday nights, and highlights on ITV)
 AEW Rampage  (2021–present, full broadcast on ITV4 on Tuesday nights, and highlights on ITV)

Former coverage
Football
 International Friendlies, Qualifiers and Play-Offs (2010–2018, from 2014 to 2018 at least one qualifier live per matchday not involving a UK Home Nation, shared with Sky Sports)
 Scotland, Wales & Northern Ireland National Team Highlights (2014–2018, live on Sky Sports and highlights on BBC NI, BBC Scotland & BBC Wales)
 England National Team Highlights and Re-runs (2008–present, Nations League and in-season friendlies live, plus highlights also on Sky Sports)
 UEFA Champions League (2nd exclusive match on ITV4 from 2005 to 2008 and delayed matches and highlights from 2008 to 2018, now on BT Sport)
UEFA Europa League (highlights from 2015 to 2018, live on BT Sport)
UEFA Super Cup Highlights (2008–2014, on ITV4 if a British club is involved & highlights from 2015 to 2018)
 FA Cup Replays (2009–2010, now on BBC Sport)
 FA Community Shield Highlights (2008–2014, now on BT Sport & BBC Sport)
 FA Trophy Final (2009, now on BT Sport)
 2006 FIFA World Cup (live and highlights)
 Euro 2008 (live and highlights)
 2010 FIFA World Cup (live and highlights)
 Euro 2012 (live and highlights)
 World Cup (Brazil 2014) (live and highlights, all major tournaments alongside BBC Sport)
 European Championships (France 2016) (live on BBC Sport & ITV Sport, selected games & highlights on ITV4)
 African Cup of Nations (2012–2015, live coverage & highlights. Now on Eurosport)
 Bundesliga (weekly highlights from 2012 to 2017)
 La Liga (2019)

Boat race
 The Boat Race (highlights from 2006 to 2009, now on BBC Sport)

Boxing
 Frank Warren fights (2006–2008, now on BoxNation and BT Sport)
 Hennessey fights (2008–2010)
 Undercard of main fight (usually shown on ITV4 with main event on ITV with all fights from 2008 to 2010 on ITV4)
 Carl Frampton Live: Undercard live on ITV4, Frampton Live on ITV & highlights on ITV4

Cricket
 Ashes Cricket (highlights from 2010 to 2011)
 IPL Cricket (2010–2014, now on BT Sport)
 Cricket World Cup Highlights (2015, live on Sky Sports with highlights on ITV & ITV4)

Snooker
 Power Snooker (2010–2011)
 World Open  (2013)
 Snooker Shoot Out (2016–2018, now on Eurosport)

Darts
 Grand Slam of Darts (2007–2010, now on Sky Sports)

Motorsport
 Formula One (highlights and re-runs from 2006 to 2008, now on Channel 4 and Sky Sports F1)
 GP2 Series (live and highlights from 2006 to 2008, now on Sky Sports F1)
 DTM (highlights from 2012–)
 Formula E (2014–2016, now on Channel 4, Quest, and Eurosport)

Cycling
 Tour of California (2011)

Rugby Union
 LV Cup Highlights (2010–2017, live on Sky Sports)
 Heineken Cup Highlights (2010–2014, live on Sky Sports, which ended when it became European Champions Cup)

Tennis
 Masters Tennis from the Royal Albert Hall (2010–2014)
 French Open (2012–2021)

References

External links 
 

2005 establishments in the United Kingdom
ITV television channels
Television channels and stations established in 2005
Television channels in the United Kingdom